This article lists the winners  of the Rotterdam Marathon, which is a marathon annually held in Rotterdam, Netherlands since 1981.

The current course records of 2:04:27 (men) and 2:18:58 (women) are set in 2009 by Duncan Kibet and in 2012 by Tiki Gelana respectively.

Belayneh Densamo has won the marathon four times, Tegla Laroupe three times, and Robert de Castella, Marius Kipserem and Carla Beurskens twice.

Men's winners

Women's winners

Victories by nation

See also
List of winners of the Amsterdam Marathon

References
 Palmares Marathon de Rotterdam

Rotterdam
Sports competitions in Rotterdam